The 1st Foot Guard Regiment was an infantry regiment of the Royal Prussian Army formed in 1806 after Napoleon defeated Prussia in the Battle of Jena–Auerstedt. It was formed by combining all previous Foot Guard Regiments and was, from its inception, the bodyguard-regiment of Kings of Prussia. Save William II, who also wore the uniforms of other regiments, all Prussian Kings and most Princes of Prussia wore the uniform of the 1st Foot Guard Regiment. All Princes of Prussia were commissioned lieutenants in the 1st Foot Guards upon their tenth birthdays. The King of Prussia was also the Colonel-in-chief of the regiment, as well as the Chief of the 1st Battalion and 1st Company of the regiment. Therefore, the regiment held the highest rank within the Prussian Army, which, among other things, meant that the officer corps of the regiment marched before the princes of the German Empire and the diplomatic corps in the traditional New Year's reception. Unofficially, the regiment was known as the "First Regiment of Christendom".

The regiment was disbanded in 1919 when the Imperial German Army was dissolved, with the Infantry Regiment 9 Potsdam of the new Reichsheer bearing its tradition. The Wachbataillon continues the tradition of this regiment in the Bundeswehr of the Federal Republic of Germany.

Regimental commanders
 4 November 1806 – 15 April 1807: Second Lieutenant Julius Ludwig von Pogwisch
 16 April 1807 – 20 January 1813: Colonel Gustav Adolph von Kessel (died 18 September 1827 as lieutenant general)
 9 February – 20 June 1813: Major Ernst Ludwig von Tippelskirch (died 23 January 1840 as lieutenant general)
 20 June 1813 – 5 April 1814: Major Friedrich Johann Carl Gebhard von Alvensleben (died 12 February 1831 as lieutenant general)
 7 April 1814 – 13 February 1816: Lt. Col Carl Heinrich von Block (died 18 January 1839 as general Commanding II. Army Corps)
 13 February 1816 – 1 June 1828: Lt. Col Eugen Max von Röder (died 10 February 1844 as lieutenant general)
 1 June 1828 – 20 September 1835: Colonel Carl Ludwig Wilhelm Ernst von Prittwitz (died 8 June 1871 as infantry general)
 20 September 1835 – 25 March 1841: Col. Franz Karl von Werder (died 3 June 1869 as infantry general)
 25 March 1841 – 27 March 1847: Col George Leopold Carl von Gayl II (died 29 November 1876 as general of the infantry)
 27 March 1847 – 4 May 1850: Col Carl Eberhard Herwarth von Bittenfeld (died 2 September 1884 as field marshal)
 4 May 1850 – 4 November 1851: Col Eduard von Brauchitsch (died 3 November 1869 as infantry general)
 4 November 1851 – 5 August 1856: Colonel Count Albert von Blumenthal (died 30 June 1860 as lieutenant general)
 5 August 1856 – 22 March 1859: Col Friedrich Wilhelm Johann Ludwig Freiherr Hiller von Gaertringen (died 3 July 1866 as lieutenant general and commander of the 1st Guard Infantry Division)
 22 March 1859 – 7 March 1863: Col Karl Graf von der Goltz (died January 1881 as lieutenant general)
 7 March 1863 – 18 May 1867: Col Bernhard von Kessel III (died 7 June 1882 as infantry general, adjutant-general)
 18 May 1867 – 18 August 1870: Col Victor Friedrich Wilhelm Joseph Dietrich von Roeder (died 18 August 1870, shot in the head at St. Privat)
 18 August – 11 December 1870: von Oppell (acting commander)
 11 December 1870 – 12 December 1874: Col Oktavio Philipp von Boehn
 12 December 1874 – 28 October 1875: Col. Anton Wilhelm Karl von L'Estocq (latterly also as general of the infantry)
 28 October 1875 – 19 October 1876: Lt. Col Otto von Derenthall (acting commander)
 20 September 1876 – 23 November 1882: Col Otto von Derenthall
 23 November 1882 – 27 January 1888: Col Oskar von Lindequist
 27 January 1888 – 9 February 1891: Col Hans von Plessen
 9 February 1891 – 9 February 1893: Col Oldwig Wilhelm Ferdinand von Natzmer (died 1899 as lieutenant general)
 9 February 1893 – 21 March 1896: Col Gustav Emil Bernhard Bodo von Kessel (latterly as lieutenant general and Commander of the 1. Guards Infantry Division)
 21 March 1896 – 15 June 1898: Col Georg von Kalckstein (latterly as lieutenant general and commander of the 13. Infantry Division)
 15 June 1898: Lt. Col Karl Freiherr von Plettenberg
 22 March 1902: Gustav Freiherr von Berg
 16 October 1906: Karl Freiherr von Willisen
 22 March 1910: Friedrich von Kleist
 20 March 1911: Friedrich von Friedeburg
 1 August 1914: Eitel Friedrich Prince of Prussia
 14 November 1914 Friedrich von Bismarck (killed at Bouvincourt, acting commander)
 6 November 1916: Siegfried Graf zu Eulenburg-Wicken (acting commander)
 28 April 1917: (ad interim) Friedrich Franz Adolf von Stephani (acting commander)
 7 July 1917 – 11 December 1918: Siegfried Graf zu Eulenburg-Wicken (acting commander)
 27 August 1918: (ad interim) Friedrich Franz Adolf von Stephani (acting commander)
 1 September – 11 December 1918: Siegfried Graf zu Eulenburg-Wicken (acting commander)
 26 September 1918: (ad interim) Friedrich Franz Adolf von Stephani (acting commander)
 30 September – 11 December 1918: Siegfried Graf zu Eulenburg-Wicken (acting commander)

See also
List of Imperial German infantry regiments

References 

Guards regiments of the Prussian Army
Military units and formations established in 1688
Military units and formations disestablished in 1919
1688 establishments in the Holy Roman Empire